Ó Coileáin (Middle Irish: Ua Cuiléin) is a Modern Irish surname generally belonging to the descendants of the last leading family of the Uí Chonaill Gabra, a sept and small but notable overkingdom of medieval and ancient Ireland, based in western County Limerick. Throughout much of their history the Uí Chonaill Gabra were in turn the leading sept of the greater regional overkingdom of the Uí Fidgenti, considered among the highest ranked princes or flatha in all the Province of Munster. Ó Coileáin/Ua Cuiléin is most commonly anglicized O'Collins and O'Cullane. The surname has also long been found in County Cork, believed largely due to the migration there, probably in the late 12th or early 13th century, of a junior branch of the County Limerick dynasty.

Kings of Uí Chonaill Gabra

Carbery branch

It is believed that what is probably a junior branch of the Uí Chonaill kings joined their distant kin the O'Donovan family of the Uí Chairpre Áebda, another great sept of the Uí Fidgenti, in their exodus to Carbery in West Cork between the late 12th and early 13th centuries.

Modern

 Michael Collins, believed his family were descendants of the Uí Chonaill Gabra. They belonged to the minor landed gentry of Carbery, and were situated in the right place, very near to O'Donovan country, for this to be quite plausible.
 Con Collins, County Limerick politician
 Mountcollins, village in the extreme southwest of County Limerick

Notes

References

 Begley, John. The Diocese of Limerick, Ancient and Medieval. Dublin: Browne & Nolan. 1906.
 Coogan, Tim Pat, Michael Collins: The Man Who Made Ireland. Palgrave Macmillan. 2002.
 Sir Richard Cox, 1st Baronet, Carberiae Notitia. 1690. extracts published in Journal of the Cork Historical and Archaeological Society, Volume XII, Second Series. 1906. pp. 142–9
 Cronnelly, Richard F., Irish Family History, Part II: A History of the Clan Eoghan, or Eoghanachts. Dublin: Goodwin, Son, and Nethercott. 1864.
 Mac Airt, Seán (ed. & tr.). The Annals of Inisfallen (MS. Rawlinson B. 503). Dublin Institute for Advanced Studies. 1951. edition translation
 MacCotter, Paul, Medieval Ireland: Territorial, Political and Economic Divisions. Dublin: Four Courts Press. 2008.
 MacGeoghegan, Connell (trans.), Denis Murphy (ed.), The Annals of Clonmacnoise. Translated 1627. Printed in Dublin by The University Press in 1896.
 O'Hart, John. Irish Pedigrees. Dublin: James Duffy and Co. 5th edition, 1892.
 Ó hInnse, Séamus (ed. & tr.) and Florence MacCarthy, Mac Carthaigh's Book, or Miscellaneous Irish Annals (A.D. 1114-1437). Dublin Institute for Advanced Studies. 1947.
 Ó Murchadha, Diarmuid, Family Names of County Cork. Cork: The Collins Press. 2nd edition, 1996.
 Stokes, Whitley (ed. & tr.), The Annals of Tigernach. Revue Celtique 16–18. 1895–1897.
 Taylor, Rex, Michael Collins. Hutchinson. 1958.

Surnames
Irish families
Surnames of Irish origin
Irish-language surnames